Fairy is a 2020 Russian drama film directed by Anna Melikyan. It was theatrically released in Russia on August 1, 2020, by KinoPoisk HD.

Plot 
The film is about a virtual reality game developer who thinks he has control over everything in this world until he meets a young and beautiful activist.

Cast

References

External links 
 

2020 films
2020s Russian-language films
2020 drama films
Russian drama films